Crumbs is an American television sitcom starring Fred Savage and Jane Curtin that ran on ABC from January 12, 2006 to February 7, 2006. It also starred William Devane, Maggie Lawson and Eddie McClintock. The show's slogan is "The normal American family turned upside down." The series was officially cancelled on May 13, 2006.

Premise
Savage played a gay screenwriter who leaves Hollywood to return home to take care of his mother (Jane Curtin), who had recently been released from a mental institution after trying to run over her husband (William Devane) after he left her for a younger woman, who turns out to be pregnant. Much of the show takes place at the family's restaurant.

Cast

Main
 Fred Savage as Mitch Crumb
 Jane Curtin as Suzanne Crumb
 Eddie McClintock as Jody Crumb
 William Devane as Billy Crumb
 Maggie Lawson as Andrea Malone
 Reginald Ballard as Elvis

Guest stars
 Elliott Gould as Frank Bergman
 Illeana Douglas as Shelley
 Rider Strong as Dennis
 Teri Garr as Lorraine Bergman
 Kevin Rahm as Roger
 Bob Glouberman as Lawyer

Episodes
Only the first five episodes were broadcast on ABC during the show's original run.

External links 
 

2000s American sitcoms
2006 American television series debuts
2006 American television series endings
American Broadcasting Company original programming
2000s American LGBT-related comedy television series
English-language television shows
Gay-related television shows
Television series by ABC Studios
Television shows set in Connecticut